Hangpang     is a village development committee in the Himalayas of Taplejung District in the Province No. 1 of north-eastern Nepal. At the time of the 2011 Nepal census it had a population of 3,719 people living in 782 individual households. There were 1,746 males and 1,973 females at the time of census.

References

External links
UN map of the municipalities of Taplejung District

Populated places in Taplejung District